Michael Barratt may refer to:
 Michael Barratt (television presenter) (1928–2022), British television presenter
 Michael Barratt (astronaut) (born 1959), American astronaut
 Shakin' Stevens (Michael Barratt, born 1948), Welsh singer

See also 
 Michael Barrett (disambiguation)